Ruaidri Ó Gadhra (died 1285) was an Irish Lord.

The Annals of the Four Masters record, sub anno 1285, "Rory O'Gara, Lord of Sliabh-Lugha, was slain by Mac Feorais Bermingham on Lough O'Gara." However by this stage the family had been exiled into Cul Ui Fionn (Coolavin, County Sligo).

External links

 
http://www.ucc.ie/celt/published/T100010A/index.html

Irish lords
Medieval Gaels from Ireland
People from County Sligo
People from County Mayo
13th-century Irish people